Belgian Quidditch Federation, or BQF, is the governing body of quidditch in Belgium. It was founded in 2012 as a Facebook page to garner interest from potential players and teams within Belgium and began to take shape in 2013 with the introduction of its first two teams: Deurne Dodo's and the Brussels Qwaffles. The organisation began to take shape as a non-profit in early 2014 with the formation of the newly-international International Quidditch Association in the form an international federation. Belgian Quidditch Federation maintains one delegate within the IQA Congress as a member of Quidditch Europe alongside Quidditch Nederland (QNL) and the Luxembourgish Quidditch Federation (FLQ). On 10 October 2014, BQF changed its name from Belgium Muggle Quidditch to its current name to better integrate with other sports in the country.

History
Belgian Quidditch Federation began in 2012 as a Facebook page, Belgium Muggle Quidditch. In 2013, Belgium saw the foundation of its two inaugural teams: Antwerp Quidditch Club and Brussels Qwaffles. Soon the first couple tournaments came to Belgium: Brussels Muscles, an international tournament and European Quidditch Cup 2014, the regional qualifier tournament for 2014 IQA World Cup.

Following its major events, BQF became a major force in the IQA's transition into a sports federation. With the IQA's release, Belgium as a member of Quidditch Europe was granted one delegate within the IQA Congress alongside the Netherlands' one as well representing the needs of the Benelux. Moreover, BQF sent its national team, the Belgian Gryffins to the flagship tournament of the IQA: Global Games 2014. In 2015, Belgian Gryffins participated in the European Games in Sarteano, Italy. In 2016, Belgian Gryffins competed in IQA World Cup 2016 in Frankfurt. The year after, the team participated in 2017 European Games in Oslo. In 2018, Belgian Gryffins will compete at IQA World Cup 2018, Firenze.

Not too long after the founding of the two first clubs, several clubs started to grow within Belgium. Belgium is currently an official home to seven clubs, ten teams and several unofficial clubs. Aside from personal growth, Belgium has grown as strong quidditch country, being home to the 2016 European Champion and 2018 European Silver medalist.

Structure
The Federation's organisational structure features the Executive Board as the heart of the non-profit. The General Assembly, a collection of the teams' presidents, vice-presidents and team managers, oversees the Executive Board. When important decisions have to be made, every team of the General Assembly gets one vote. That way Belgian Quidditch Federation keeps their decision making process democratic.

Executive Board 
The Executive Board currently exists out of six members. The Executive board maintains the day to day supervision of Belgian Quidditch Federation.

President: Laurens Grinwis Plaat Stultjes

Vice-president: Lana Naudts

Secretary: Pauline Raes

Communications, marketing & PR Director: Lore Badts

Financial Director: Ellen Huycke

IT Director: Lars Peeters

Marketing team 
Belgian Quidditch Federation also has its own marketing team. The team is under the supervision of Lore, the marketing director. The marketing team occupies itself with creating content to keep Belgian Quidditch Federation 
Branding Specialist: Jelmer Lokman

Wallonia Advisor: Nicolas Dehez

Content Creator: Hanne Van Tichelt

Video Content Creator: Hanne Frederickx

Multimedia Developer: Jan Dubois

Belgian Gryffins 
Belgian Gryffins is the national quidditch team of Belgium. The management team of the 2018 squad is:

Team Manager: Rik De Boeck

Team Manager: Lore Badts

Fundraising Manager: Dorien De Vos

Logistics Manager: Charlotte Geerolf

Administrative Wing
The Administrative Wing of the Core Cabinet consists of three departmental heads: Teams, Gameplay and Communications. All three departmental heads are in charge of staff their respective department as well as overseeing the management of their department within BQF. The different departments can be broken down into smaller subdivisions where teams holds membership, expansion and development; the gameplay department has snitching, reffing, coaching and rules; and the communications department holds PR, tech, marketing and translations & interpretations.

Teams Department
The director for the Teams Department is Joke Daems. Under the Team's supervision is: membership, expansion and development.

Gameplay Department
Headed by Laurens Grinwis Plaat Stultjes, the Gameplay Department is staffed also by Tanghi Burlion as the Snitch Director and Gorik Verbeken as the Coaching Director.

Communications Department
The Communications Department is headed by Cindy Callens, under whom there is Nicolas Volders as the Tech Director and Caroline Mailleux as the Translations & Interpretation Director.

Competitions
BQF, being an official member of Quidditch Europe and of Quidditch Europe, participates in three major tournaments yearly: the Neighbourhood Cup, the Belgian Cup (now known as the EQC Qualifiers) and the European Quidditch Cup. As well, being a part of the International Quidditch Association, Belgium sends its national team, the Gryffins, to the Global Games, a tournament held biennially. With the release of its competitions plan in 2014, BQF has defined official tournaments held within (and outside of) Belgium through its Gameplay Department. Teams interested in hosting official matches or tournaments must now do so through the Gameplay Director.

European Quidditch Cup

Belgian Quidditch League

Membership

The 2013/2014 season saw BQF have a fairly weak membership plan where players for teams paid an informal fee that went towards player/league insurance and IQA payments. The plan for the 2014/2015 season was released on 14 November 2014 where it saw a completely updated structure using terms, a period running from 1 July to 31 December and 1 January to 30 June.

Official teams
Currently, there are no official teams in BQF as the season begins on 1 December 2015. At the moment, there are seven to eight active teams across the country, being:
 Brussels Qwaffles
 Deurne Dodo's
 UMonsters Quidditch Team
 Ghent Gargoyles
 Les Dracognards / Quidditch Louvain-la-Neuve
 Hasselt Horntails
 Leuven Leprechauns

Competitive Team
One of three levels of membership offered is Competitive Team (CT) where teams are required to play three official matches per term. CTs are allowed to participate in the BNLC as well as EQC.

Recreational Team
A Recreational Team (RT) is the lowest level of playing membership where teams pay less and are required to play in fewer official matches, but they are restricted from participating in BNLC and EQC. Additionally, players on RTs must get permission before participating in national team try-outs.

Supporter
The final tier of membership is for those outside Belgium or are non-players within Belgium. This offers active quidditch players in other NGBs the ability to participate in national team try-outs as well as giving non-players both inside and outside Belgium the ability to support BQF financially with potential benefits not yet designated.

National team

BQF also hosts a national team, the Belgian Gryffins. They made their debut at the 2014 IQA Global Games in Vancouver, B.C., Canada on 19 July 2014. Due to lack of resources for the country's best players to make it to Vancouver and the limited roster available, Team Belgium came in seventh of seven place at the Games, ultimately forfeiting their final match against the USA due to numerous injuries the team faced.

As of the 2014/2015 season, the national team saw a few updates. Now, it is on a yearly turn-over rate where individuals must try-out every year they wish to participate. Whilst the season technically ends every 30 June, any tournament involving the national team held in July will be considered to be a part of the previous season. Individuals wishing to try out must be a part of a CT of that season. Those on an RT must be granted permission by the VP Internal of their region as well as the Teams Director before being allowed to try out. Any Belgian citizen living outside Belgium and an active participant in quidditch activities is able to try out with the purchase of Supporter membership at the approval of the VP External.

See also

 Muggle quidditch
 International Quidditch Association
 Sport in Belgium

References

External links
Belgium
 BQF Facebook Page
 BQF Twitter
 Belgian Gryffins, Belgium national quidditch team's Facebook Page
 Belgian Gryffins Twitter

International Quidditch Association
 IQA Quidditch Website
 IQA Rulebook 7

Quidditch governing bodies
Quidditch
Sports organisations of Belgium
2012 establishments in Belgium